The 1992 Senior British Open was a professional golf tournament for players aged 50 and above and the sixth Senior British Open, held from 23 to 26 July at Royal Lytham & St Annes Golf Club in Lytham St Annes, Lancashire, England, United Kingdom.

52-year-old John Fourie won by three strokes over Bob Charles and Neil Coles, to capture his first Senior British Open title and first senior major championship victory.

Tours 
1992 was the inaugural year of the European Senior Tour, later renamed the Legends Tour. The 1992 event was the first Senior British Open to be part of the tour schedule.

In 2018, the tournament was, as all Senior British Open Championships played 1987–2002, retroactively recognized as a senior major golf championship and an event on the PGA Tour Champions.

Venue 

The event was the second Senior Open Championship of four in a row held at Royal Lytham & St Annes Golf Club.

Field
122 players entered the competition. Four players withdraw. 50 players, all of them professionals, made the 36-hole cut.

Past champions in the field
All four past Senior British Open champions participated. All of them made the 36-hole cut, 1989 champion Bob Charles (tied 2nd), 1987 champion Neil Coles (tied 2nd), 1988 and 1990 champion Gary Player (tied 7th) and 1991 champion Bobby Verway (tied 18th).

Past winners and runners-up at  The Open Championship in the field 
The field included three former winners of The Open Championship. All of them made the cut, 1963 Open champion Bob Charles (tied 2nd), 1959, 1968 and 1974 Open champion Gary Player (tied 7th) and 1961 and 1962 Open champion Arnold Palmer (tied 9th).

The field also included three former runners-up at The Open Championship. Neil Coles (tied 2nd), Christy O'Connor Snr (13th) and Brian Huggett (19th).

Final results 
Sunday, 26 July 1992

Source:

References

External links 
 Coverage on European Tour website

Senior major golf championships
Golf tournaments in England
Senior British Open
Senior British Open
Senior British Open